Bóveda is a municipality in the province of Lugo, Galicia, northwestern Spain. It belongs to the comarca of Terra de Lemos. The population in 2008 was 1,719 people according to the municipal register of inhabitants.

Monuments
 Igrexa de San Martiño
 Capela de San Xil
 Pazo dos Condes de Liria-Bóveda 
 Praza da Filgueira 
 Concello 
 Capela do Ecce-Homo 
 Igrexa dos Santos Pedro e Santiago

Civil parishes
 Bóveda (San Martiño)
 Freituxe (Santiago)
 Guntín (San Cristovo)
 Martín (San Cristovo)
 Mosteiro (San Paio)
 Remesar (San Xoán)
 Ribas Pequenas (Santiago) 
 Rubián (Santiago)
 Sanfiz de Rubián (Sanfiz)
 Teilán (Santa Baia)
 Tuimil (Santa María)
 Ver (San Vicenzo)
 Vilalpape (San Bartolomeu)
 Vilarbuxán (San Bartolomeu)

References

Municipalities in the Province of Lugo